Mahandiana-Sokourani (also spelled Mahandiana-Soukourani) is a town in north-western Ivory Coast. It is a sub-prefecture of Kaniasso Department in Folon Region, Denguélé District.

Mahandiana-Sokourani was a commune until March 2012, when it became one of 1126 communes nationwide that were abolished.

In 2014, the population of the sub-prefecture of Mahandiana-Sokourani was 26,026
.

Villages
The 12 villages of the sub-prefecture of Mahandiana-Sokourani and their population in 2014 are:

References

Sub-prefectures of Folon Region
Former communes of Ivory Coast